Mitochondrial myopathies are types of myopathies associated with mitochondrial disease. On biopsy, the muscle tissue of patients with these diseases usually demonstrate "ragged red" muscle fibers.  These ragged-red fibers contain mild accumulations of glycogen and neutral lipids, and may show an increased reactivity for succinate dehydrogenase and a decreased reactivity for cytochrome c oxidase.  Inheritance was believed to be maternal (non-Mendelian extranuclear). It is now known that certain nuclear DNA deletions can also cause mitochondrial myopathy such as the OPA1 gene deletion. There are several subcategories of mitochondrial myopathies.

Signs and symptoms
Signs and symptoms include (for each of the following causes):
 Mitochondrial encephalomyopathy, lactic acidosis, and stroke-like syndrome (MELAS)
 Varying degrees of cognitive impairment and dementia
 Lactic acidosis
 Strokes
 Transient ischemic attacks
 Hearing loss
 Weight loss
 Myoclonic epilepsy and ragged-red fibers (MERRF)
 Progressive myoclonic epilepsy
 Clumps of diseased mitochondria accumulate in muscle fibers and appear as "ragged-red fibers" when muscle is stained with modified Gömöri trichrome stain
 Short stature
 Kearns–Sayre syndrome (KSS)
 External ophthalmoplegia
 Cardiac conduction defects
 Sensorineural hearing loss
 Chronic progressive external ophthalmoplegia (CPEO)
 Progressive ophthalmoparesis
 Symptomatic overlap with other mitochondrial myopathies

Cause
Mitochondrial myopathy literally means mitochondrial muscle weakness, muscle weakness caused by mitochondrial dysfunction. The mitochondrion is the powerhouse of the cell. Every muscle cell has mitochondria, and if the muscle cell’s mitochondria have problems by which there is not enough energy to function or perform its duties, problems occur. The cause may be genetic, such as a variation within the POLG (polymerase gamma) gene, which causes mitochondrial DNA (mtDNA) to become damaged and lose function.

Diagnosis

Muscle biopsy: ragged red fibers in Gömöri trichrome stain.

Treatment
Although no cure currently exists, there is hope in treatment for this class of hereditary diseases trials continue.

See also 

 Metabolic Myopathies

References

External links 

Myoneural junction and neuromuscular diseases
Mitochondrial diseases